This is a list of presidents of the House of Ariki of the Cook Islands from 1978:

Footnotes and references

Cook Islands
Presidents